Jinfang Subdistrict is a subdistrict situated in Anning City, Yunnan province, southwestern China. It is  a southeastern district of the city of Anning. Formerly it was a part of Lianran Town, Anning City. The Lianran Town is divided into two subdistrict: Lianran and Jinfang in 2008.

References

Anning, Yunnan
Township-level divisions of Kunming